HMS Guysborough was a VTE-engined  of the Royal Navy. Before commissioning she was transferred to the Royal Canadian Navy on loan. She saw action in the Battle of the Atlantic and the Invasion of Normandy.

Design and description
They came in two versions powered by different engines; those with a diesel engines and those with vertical triple-expansion steam engines. Guysborough was of the latter design and was larger than her diesel-engined cousins. She had a complement of 6 officers and 77 enlisted.

Guysborough had two vertical triple-expansion steam engines, each driving one shaft, using steam provided by two Admiralty three-drum boilers.

British Bangor-class minesweepers were armed with a single 12-pounder 12 cwt HA gun mounted forward. For anti-aircraft purposes, the minesweepers were equipped with one QF 2-pounder Mark VIII and two single-mounted QF 20 mm Oerlikon guns. The 2-pounder gun was later replaced with a twin 20 mm Oerlikon mount. As a convoy escort, Guysborough was deployed with 40 depth charges launched from two depth charge throwers and four chutes.

Service history
Guysborough was ordered on 28 November 1940. The minesweeper's keel was laid down on 28 May 1941 by North Van Ship Repairs Ltd. at North Vancouver and the ship was launched on 21 July later that year. Guysborough was loaned to the Royal Canadian Navy and commissioned on 22 April 1942.

After commissioning, Guysborough was assigned to Esquimalt Force. She remained with the unit until March 1943 when she transferred to the east coast, arriving at the end of April. She saw brief service with the Western Local Escort Force before joining the Halifax Local Defence Force.

In mid-September 1943, Guysborough sailed to Baltimore where she underwent a refit that took six weeks to complete. In February 1944, she was sent to the United Kingdom as part of Canada's contribution to the invasion of Normandy. Upon arrival she was assigned to the British 14th Minesweeping Flotilla and swept Channel 2 in the American sector of the invasion route of mines during the night of 5–6 June. The 14th Minesweeping Flotilla resumed minesweeping activities an hour after the assault began on 6 June. They swept Baie de la Seine until 13 June. The 14th flotilla continued minesweeping activities in the invasion area until 21 June. She remained in UK waters until December when she returned to Canada to undergo another refit, this time at Lunenburg.

In March, following completion of the refit, Guysborough was ordered back to the United Kingdom. While en route, she was torpedoed.

Sinking
The minesweeper had been sailing alone from Horta to Plymouth when she was hit. The torpedo struck the stern, which caused significant damage and a slight list to port, but the ship refused to sink. However, no casualties were suffered. U-868 fired a coup de grâce which struck amidships on the starboard side of the ship at 19:35. Two members of the crew died in the explosion and several injured. The vessel settled slowly and sank after 35 minutes. Of the remaining crew, 49 died while awaiting rescue. 40 survivors were rescued by  19 hours after the ship had been attacked with another picked up by  while searching for the submarine.

References

Notes

Citations

Sources
 
 
 
 
 
 

 

Bangor-class minesweepers of the Royal Navy
Ships built in British Columbia
1941 ships
World War II minesweepers of the United Kingdom
Ships sunk by German submarines in World War II
Maritime incidents in March 1945
World War II shipwrecks in the Atlantic Ocean
Shipwrecks in the Bay of Biscay
Bangor-class minesweepers of the Royal Canadian Navy